Pathlight may refer to:

Pathlight Technology, an American manufacturer of storage area network products
Pathlight School, a Singaporean school for high-functioning autistic children
Pathlight (magazine), a magazine featuring Chinese literature in English translation